PFL Fight Night was mixed martial arts event promoted by the Professional Fighters League that was held on June 30, 2017 at the Daytona International Speedway in Daytona Beach, Florida. 

It was the first event to be promoted under the PFL name following the rebranding of World Series Of Fighting by its new owners, MMAX Investment Partners.

Background
The event took place in the infield at the Daytona International Speedway as a planned precursor to the Coca-Cola Firecracker 250 NASCAR XFINITY Series race, but the race was postponed until July 1 due to rain, and the fights began several hours earlier than expected. 

The show drew an average of 291,000 viewers on NBC Sports Network and peaked at 495,000 for the headliner, giving the network its second-largest audience ever viewership at that time.

Results

See also
List of PFL events
List of PFL champions
List of current PFL fighters

References

Professional Fighters League
2017 in mixed martial arts
Events in Daytona Beach, Florida